Monmouth Beach is a borough in Monmouth County, New Jersey, United States. As of the 2010 United States census, the borough's population was 3,279, reflecting a decline of 316 (−8.8%) from the 3,595 counted in the 2000 Census, which had in turn increased by 292 (+8.8%) from the 3,303 counted in the 1990 Census.

History
The area was first settled in 1668 and grew into a community with the arrival of the Long Branch and Sea Shore Railroad.

Many early residents were professional fishermen with Norwegian backgrounds.

Monmouth Beach was incorporated as a borough on March 9, 1906, by an act of the New Jersey Legislature, when it was created from portions of Ocean Township.

Geography
According to the United States Census Bureau, the borough had a total area of 2.07 square miles (5.37 km2), including 1.04 square miles (2.70 km2) of land and 1.03 square miles (2.67 km2) of water (49.81%).

The borough is a small beach community located on the Jersey Shore, known for its Victorian houses and the new multimillion-dollar homes located throughout the neighborhood. It was recently affected by Hurricane Sandy, damaging multiple homes. Monmouth Beach is one square mile, with the ocean to the east and the Shrewsbury River to the northwest. In the Forbes magazine 2012 rankings of "America's Most Expensive ZIP Codes", the borough was ranked 276th, with a median price of $937,020.

Unincorporated communities, localities and place names located partially or completely within the township include Galilee. The Sea Bright–Monmouth Beach Seawall parallel to the ocean.

The borough is bordered by the Monmouth County communities of Little Silver, Long Branch, Oceanport, Rumson and Sea Bright.

Within Monmouth Beach are two beach clubs. These are Monmouth Beach Bathing Pavilion, known to locals as "Little Monmouth", and Monmouth Beach Bath and Tennis Club, also known as "Big Monmouth". These spacious beach clubs equipped with pool and beach access. They have lockers, activities, swim teams, and more. Many locals and area residents attend these beach clubs.

Monmouth Beach offers fishing, as well as surfable waves. The Shrewsbury River, which borders the borough, offers sailing, kayaking, and fishing. The great majority of the borough of Monmouth Beach is residential. Places to go within the area include the many restaurants, lounges, and bars in West End, and Pier Village in Long Branch. Other notable locations include Red Bank, and the numerous beaches all along the shore towns to the north and south such as Asbury Park.

Demographics

Census 2010

The Census Bureau's 2006–2010 American Community Survey showed that (in 2010 inflation-adjusted dollars) median household income was $94,583 (with a margin of error of +/− $29,606) and the median family income was $129,886 (+/− $7,489). Males had a median income of $108,369 (+/− $6,617) versus $76,813 (+/− $5,948) for females. The per capita income for the borough was $61,385 (+/− $8,902). About 2.1% of families and 2.7% of the population were below the poverty line, including 3.8% of those under age 18 and 3.0% of those age 65 or over.

Census 2000
As of the 2000 United States census there were 3,595 people, 1,633 households, and 976 families residing in the borough. The population density was 1, 297.2/km2 (3,354.4/sq mi). There were 1,969 housing units at an average density of 1,837.2 per square mile (710.5/km2). The racial makeup of the borough was 97.66% White, 0.53% African American, 0.86% Asian, 0.33% from other races, and 0.61% from two or more races. Hispanic or Latino of any race were 1.89% of the population.

There were 1,633 households, out of which 23.3% had children under the age of 18 living with them, 49.7% were married couples living together, 7.5% had a female householder with no husband present, and 40.2% were non-families. 35.2% of all households were made up of individuals, and 13.5% had someone living alone who was 65 years of age or older. The average household size was 2.20 and the average family size was 2.89.

In the borough the population was spread out, with 20.3% under the age of 18, 3.5% from 18 to 24, 27.0% from 25 to 44, 28.9% from 45 to 64, and 20.4% who were 65 years of age or older. The median age was 45 years. For every 100 females, there were 88.1 males. For every 100 females age 18 and over, there were 84.8 males.

The median income for a household in the borough was $80,484, and the median income for a family was $93,401. Males had a median income of $65,060 versus $45,208 for females. The per capita income for the borough was $52,862. About 1.4% of families and 1.9% of the population were below the poverty line, including 2.4% of those under age 18 and 2.3% of those age 65 or over.

Government

Local government
The Borough of Monmouth Beach has been governed under the Walsh Act, by a three-member commission, since 1929. The borough is one of 30 municipalities (of the 564) statewide that use the commission form of government. The governing body is comprised of a three-member commission, whose members are elected at-large in non-partisan elections to serve four-year terms of office on a concurrent basis in elections held every four years as part of the May municipal election.

, members of the Borough Commission are 
Mayor David F. Stickle (Commissioner of Public Affairs and Public Safety), 
Lawrence M. Bolsch (Commissioner of Revenue and Finance) and 
Timothy Somers (Commissioner of Public Works, Parks and Public Property), whose terms of office end concurrently as of May 17, 2025.

Federal, state and county representation
Monmouth Beach is located in the 6th Congressional District and is part of New Jersey's 13th state legislative district. Prior to the 2011 reapportionment following the 2010 Census, Monmouth Beach had been in the 11th state legislative district.

 

Monmouth County is governed by a Board of County Commissioners comprised of five members who are elected at-large to serve three year terms of office on a staggered basis, with either one or two seats up for election each year as part of the November general election. At an annual reorganization meeting held in the beginning of January, the board selects one of its members to serve as director and another as deputy director. , Monmouth County's Commissioners are
Commissioner Director Thomas A. Arnone (R, Neptune City, term as commissioner and as director ends December 31, 2022), 
Commissioner Deputy Director Susan M. Kiley (R, Hazlet Township, term as commissioner ends December 31, 2024; term as deputy commissioner director ends 2022),
Lillian G. Burry (R, Colts Neck Township, 2023),
Nick DiRocco (R, Wall Township, 2022), and 
Ross F. Licitra (R, Marlboro Township, 2023). 
Constitutional officers elected on a countywide basis are
County clerk Christine Giordano Hanlon (R, 2025; Ocean Township), 
Sheriff Shaun Golden (R, 2022; Howell Township) and 
Surrogate Rosemarie D. Peters (R, 2026; Middletown Township).

Politics
As of March 23, 2011, there were a total of 2,550 registered voters in Monmouth Beach, of which 605 (23.7%) were registered as Democrats, 742 (29.1%) were registered as Republicans and 1,200 (47.1%) were registered as Unaffiliated. There were 3 voters registered as Libertarians or Greens.

In the 2012 presidential election, Republican Mitt Romney received 62.5% of the vote (1,132 cast), ahead of Democrat Barack Obama with 36.6% (662 votes), and other candidates with 0.9% (16 votes), among the 1,826 ballots cast by the borough's 2,620 registered voters (16 ballots were spoiled), for a turnout of 69.7%. In the 2008 presidential election, Republican John McCain received 57.3% of the vote (1,196 cast), ahead of Democrat Barack Obama with 40.1% (837 votes) and other candidates with 1.2% (24 votes), among the 2,086 ballots cast by the borough's 2,725 registered voters, for a turnout of 76.6%. In the 2004 presidential election, Republican George W. Bush received 60.3% of the vote (1,270 ballots cast), outpolling Democrat John Kerry with 38.8% (817 votes) and other candidates with 0.7% (19 votes), among the 2,107 ballots cast by the borough's 2,813 registered voters, for a turnout percentage of 74.9.

In the 2013 gubernatorial election, Republican Chris Christie received 78.7% of the vote (917 cast), ahead of Democrat Barbara Buono with 20.2% (235 votes), and other candidates with 1.1% (13 votes), among the 1,181 ballots cast by the borough's 2,557 registered voters (16 ballots were spoiled), for a turnout of 46.2%. In the 2009 gubernatorial election, Republican Chris Christie received 65.1% of the vote (1,015 ballots cast), ahead of  Democrat Jon Corzine with 28.4% (443 votes), Independent Chris Daggett with 5.5% (86 votes) and other candidates with 0.4% (7 votes), among the 1,559 ballots cast by the borough's 2,621 registered voters, yielding a 59.5% turnout.

Education
Public school students in pre-kindergarten through eighth grade are served by the Monmouth Beach School District at Monmouth Beach School. As of the 2018–19 school year, the district, comprised of one school, had an enrollment of 236 students and 26.5 classroom teachers (on an FTE basis), for a student–teacher ratio of 8.9:1. Karen Ginty, a kindergarten teacher at Monmouth Beach Elementary School who had been at the school for 33 years, was named the 2006–2007 New Jersey State Teacher of the Year.

Public school students in ninth through twelfth grades attend Shore Regional High School, a regional high school that also serves students from the constituent districts of Oceanport, Sea Bright and West Long Branch. The high school is located in West Long Branch and is part of the Shore Regional High School District. As of the 2018–19 school year, the high school had an enrollment of 649 students and 57.2 classroom teachers (on an FTE basis), for a student–teacher ratio of 11.3:1. Seats on the high school district's nine-member board of education are allocated based on the population of the constituent municipalities, with one seat assigned to Monmouth Beach.

Public school students from Monmouth Beach, and all of Monmouth County, are eligible to apply to attend the schools of the Monmouth County Vocational School District.

Transportation

Roads and highways

New Jersey Route 36 (Ocean Avenue) is the main highway serving Monmouth Beach. Route 36 connects the borough to Long Branch on the south and Sea Bright to the north.

Public transportation
Academy Bus provided bus service to Newark on the 61 route.

The SeaStreak ferry route to Wall Street and the East Side of Manhattan in New York City is a 10–15 minute drive to Atlantic Highlands / Highlands.

Climate
According to the Köppen climate classification system, Monmouth Beach has a humid subtropical climate (Cfa). Cfa climates are characterized by all months having an average temperature > , at least four months with an average temperature ≥ , at least one month with an average temperature ≥  and no significant precipitation difference between seasons. Although most summer days are slightly humid with a cooling afternoon sea breeze in Monmouth Beach, episodes of heat and high humidity can occur with heat index values > . The average wettest month is July which correlates with the peak in thunderstorm activity. Episodes of extreme cold and wind can occur with wind chill values < .

Ecology
According to the A. W. Kuchler U.S. potential natural vegetation types, Monmouth Beach would have a dominant vegetation type of Appalachian Oak (104) with a dominant vegetation form of Eastern Hardwood Forest (25). The average date of first spring leaf-out is March 24 and fall color typically peaks in early-November.

Notable people

People who were born in, residents of, or otherwise closely associated with Monmouth Beach include:

 William Warren Barbour (1888–1943), represented New Jersey in the United States Senate from 1931 to 1937
 Warren A. Croll Jr. (1920-2008), retired Hall of Fame Thoroughbred race horse trainer
 William Fargo (1818–1881), founder of Wells Fargo
 John Farrell (born 1962), former MLB baseball player and pitching coach; former manager of the Boston Red Sox
 Jim Garrett (born 1930), former NFL football player and coach
 Kim Guadagno (born 1959), former Monmouth Beach commissioner, elected sheriff of Monmouth County, New Jersey and first Lieutenant Governor of New Jersey
 Jay Gould (1836–1892), railroad magnate and financial speculator
 I. Kathleen Hagen (born 1945), physician who gained notoriety for being accused of murder by asphyxia of her parents
 Garret Hobart (1844–1899), United States vice president
 Philip B. Hofmann (1909–1986), businessman who was the first non-family-member to serve as chairman and chief executive officer of Johnson & Johnson
 Frederick K. Humphreys (1816–1900), physician and the founder of Humphreys Homeopathic Medicine Company
 Guglielmo Marconi (1874–1937), wireless radio pioneer
 Malcolm McKesson (1909–1999), outsider artist known for his ballpoint pen drawings and his erotic fiction
 Priscilla Ransohoff (1912–1992), military education specialist and advocate for women in science and federal employment.
 Brian Wenning (born 1981), professional skateboarder

References

External links

Borough of Monmouth Beach official website
Monmouth Beach School

School Data for the Monmouth Beach School, National Center for Education Statistics
Shore Regional High School

 
1906 establishments in New Jersey
Boroughs in Monmouth County, New Jersey
Jersey Shore communities in Monmouth County
Populated places established in 1906
Walsh Act